Chita (also called Cheetah) is a 2005 Indian action drama film made in Bengali language, directed by T L V Prasad, starring Mithun Chakraborty and Rambha in lead roles. The film is one among the 26 collaboration between the lead actor Mithun Chakraborty and director T L V Prasad, a record certified by Limca Book of Records.

The film is also popular for its famous dialogue Shaaper chobol aar cheetar khabol, jekhanei porbey arai kg mangsho tuley nebe.. delivered by actor Mithun Chakraborty. This film is an unofficial remake of the 1981 Tamil film Sattam Oru Iruttarai.

Summary
Chita is the story of an honest boy seeking revenge on his father's killers, but to fight and kill them is quite a task as the killers are now influential people in society.

Cast
 Mithun Chakraborty
 Rambha
 Rajesh Sharma
 Kaushik Banerjee
 Biplab Chatterjee
 Bharat Kaul
 Subhasish Mukherjee
 N.K Salil
 Narugopal Mandal
 Sanjib Dasgupta

References

External links 
 

2005 films
Bengali-language Indian films
Mithun's Dream Factory films
Films shot in Ooty
2000s Bengali-language films
Bengali remakes of Tamil films
Bengali remakes of Hindi films
Indian films about revenge
Films directed by T. L. V. Prasad
Indian action films
Films scored by Babul Bose
2005 action films